FFN may refer to:

 FanFiction.Net, a fan fiction archive site
 Fast Food Nation, a book by Eric Schlosser
 Fédération Française de Natation, the French Swimming Federation
 Fetal fibronectin
 Free French Navy
 Friend Finder Networks, a social media website
 Full frontal nudity
 Radio ffn, a German radio channel
 "Full Frontal Nudity", an episode of Monty Python's Flying Circus
 Flip-Flop Nation, an exclamatory used when one wears flip-flop sandals